Stand by Your Man is an EP released in 1982. It is a collaboration of the bands Motörhead and the Plasmatics. It is notorious as the reason "Fast" Eddie left Motörhead, more so than the bad reception the EP received. Lemmy and Wendy O. Williams had organised to do a duet of the famous Tammy Wynette country song, though most critics, and fans, to this day are baffled by the choice, Wendy coming from the punk scene in the mid-late 1970s and Lemmy from a mixture of Rock genres.

Recording
Following the success of the Motörhead/Girlschool collaboration, St. Valentine's Day Massacre EP, Lemmy kept getting asked to do another collaboration. Having seen pictures of O. Williams and knowing of her reputation, alongside Lemmy's penchant for "making records with birds," the band flew to Toronto for a recording session with her group, the Plasmatics. Lemmy explained about the session:

Lemmy believes that if Dick had not been there, they could have worked through the problems, but ended up exchanging a few words and Clarke left the studio. Back at the hotel, drummer Phil "Philthy Animal" Taylor told Lemmy "Eddie's left the band".  Clarke was replaced a week later by Thin Lizzy man, Brian Robertson. In the book Overkill: The Untold Story of Motorhead, biographer Joel McIver quotes Taylor saying:
 
It is more likely that Clarke left because of mounting tension with Kilmister, who had been unhappy with Clarke's production on the Iron Fist album and fed up with Clarke's continued threats to leave.  In an interview with Scott Adams that appears on Clarke's official website, the guitarist insists:

Release 
It was released to little fan fare and sold poorly according to Lemmy. It was reissued in various countries in the eighties; but since then it is only available on the Bronze Records compilation album No Remorse, of 1984, remastered reissue by Sanctuary Records in 2005, as part of the deluxe edition remastered series they did.

Reception
One reviewer commented that although "Lemmy has always said that the late Wendy O’Williams was a wonderful person, this doesn’t alter the fact that [Stand By Your Man] is a truly horrible track".

Track listing

Personnel
 Lemmy Kilmister – lead vocals on "Stand by Your Man" & "Masterplan", bass guitar
 Phil "Philthy Animal" Taylor – drums
 Wendy O. Williams – lead vocals on "Stand by Your Man" & "No Class"
 Richie Stotts – lead guitar
 Wes Beech – rhythm guitar

Production
 Producer, Engineer & Mixer - "Fast" Eddie Clarke & Will "Evil Red Neck" Reid

References 

1982 EPs
Motörhead EPs
Punk rock EPs
Bronze Records EPs